Daniel Smith (born 19 March 2002) is a South African cricketer. In February 2021, Smith was named as the captain of the South Africa national under-19 cricket team. He made his Twenty20 debut on 26 September 2021, for Western Province in the 2021–22 CSA Provincial T20 Knock-Out tournament. He made his first-class debut on 18 November 2021, for Western Province in the 2021–22 CSA 4-Day Series. He made his List A debut on 16 March 2022, for Western Province in the 2021–22 CSA One-Day Cup.

References

External links
 

2002 births
Living people
South African cricketers
Western Province cricketers
Place of birth missing (living people)